The 2022 Indy Challenger was a professional tennis tournament played on indoor hard courts. It was the first edition of the tournament which was part of the 2022 ATP Challenger Tour. It took place in Indianapolis, United States between 18 and 24 July 2022.

Singles main draw entrants

Seeds

 1 Rankings as of July 11, 2022.

Other entrants
The following players received wildcards into the singles main draw:
  Nishesh Basavareddy
  Michail Pervolarakis
  Alex Rybakov

The following player received entry into the singles main draw using a protected ranking:
  Andrew Harris

The following players received entry into the singles main draw as special exempts:
  Ben Shelton
  Wu Yibing

The following players received entry into the singles main draw as alternates:
  Aleksandar Kovacevic
  Li Tu

The following players received entry from the qualifying draw:
  Hady Habib
  Brandon Holt
  Aidan McHugh
  Shang Juncheng
  Sho Shimabukuro
  Evan Zhu

The following player received entry as a lucky loser:
  Billy Harris

Champions

Singles 

  Wu Yibing def.  Aleksandar Kovacevic 6–7(10–12), 7–6(15–13), 6–3.

Doubles 

  Hans Hach Verdugo /  Hunter Reese def.  Purav Raja /  Divij Sharan 7–6(7–3), 3–6, [10–7].

References

Indy Challenger
Indy Challenger
July 2022 sports events in the United States
2022 in sports in Indiana